The 1976 Honduran Segunda División was the tenth season of the Honduran Segunda División.  Under the management of Roberto Ortega, C.D. Victoria won the tournament after defeating C.D. Curacao in the final series and obtained promotion to the 1977–78 Honduran Liga Nacional.

Final

 Victoria won 2–0 on aggregate.

References

Segunda
1976